Communauté d'agglomération du Nord Grande-Terre is a communauté d'agglomération, an intercommunal structure in the Guadeloupe overseas department and region of France. Created in 2014, its seat is in Port-Louis. Its area is 324.6 km2. Its population was 56,466 in 2019.

Composition
The communauté d'agglomération consists of the following 5 communes:
Anse-Bertrand
Morne-à-l'Eau
Le Moule
Petit-Canal
Port-Louis

References

Nord Grande-Terre
Nord Grande-Terre